Lee Slonimsky is an American poet, Pythagorean scholar, Managing Partner of Ocean Partners LP and the Literary Executor of the Daniel Hoffman Archive, Library of Congress.

Biography

Lee Slonimsky is a poet and "Pythagorean" scholar, polymath and the author of nine collections of poetry whose poems have been anthologized in Poetry in Medicine and The Bloomsbury Anthology of Contemporary Jewish American Poetry to name a few. His poetry has appeared in places such as The Carolina Quarterly, The New York Times and Poetry Daily. He is the co-author with Carol Goodman, his wife and Hammett Prize novelist, of The Black Swan Rising trilogy (under the name Lee Carroll). He is a native New Yorker.

Bibliography

Poetry

 Lion, Gnat, Spuyten Duyvil Press, NYC, 2017, 
 Consulting with the Swifts: New and Selected Poems, 1983-2016, Spuyten Duyvil Press, NYC, 
 Red-Tailed Hawk on Wall Street, Spuyten Duyvil Press, NYC, 2015, 
 Pythagore Amoureux/Pythagoras in Love, English/French transl. by Elizabeth J. Coleman, Folded Word Press, 2015, 
 Wandering Electron, Spuyten Duyvil Press, NYC, 2014, 
 Logician of the Wind, Orchises Press, 2012, 
 Pythagoras in Love,  Orchises Press, 2007, 
 Money and Light,  Sulphur River Literary Review Press, 2002.  
 Talk Between Leaf and Skin,  Sulphur River Literary Review Press, 2002,

Anthologies

 Poetry in Medicine, Edited by Michael Salcman, Persea Books, 2015, 
 The Bloomsbury Anthology of Contemporary Jewish American Poetry, Bloomsbury Press, 2013, 
 The Waiting Room Reader, Vol. II, Edited by Rachel Hadas, CavanKerry Press, 2013,

Fiction
 Bermuda Gold, Moonshine Cove Publishing, 2015, 
 The Shape Stealer, as Lee Carroll (with Carol Goodman), Tor Books USA/Transworld (Bantam) UK, 2013, 
 The Watchtower, as Lee Carroll (with Carol Goodman), Tor Books USA/Transworld (Bantam) UK, 2011, 
 Black Swan Rising, as Lee Carroll (with Carol Goodman), Tor Books USA and Transworld (Bantam) UK, 2010,

Readings and talks 
 "Poetry@theCentury", 10th Anniversary of Poetry@theCentury, Century Association, NYC, March 2018
 "Poetry in Sonoma", Reading with Katherine Hastings, 2017 
 "Poetry with Lee Slonimsky", The Athens Centre, June, 2017 
 "Balancing Pythagorean and Heraclitean Themes", Athens Academy, Research Centre for Greek Philosophy, Lee Slonimsky and Ginger F. Zaimis, November 2016
 "Writers on Writers Series", In Conversation with Lee Slonimsky, May 2016 
 "Poetic Dialogues: NYC to ATHENS" with Lee Slonimsky, Carol Goodman & Ginger F. Zaimis, The Athens Centre, May 2016
 "Poetry with Lee Slonimsky, John Tripoulas and Demetrios Golemis", The Athens Centre, 2013

References

Living people
American poets
Formalist poets
The New Yorker people
Writers from New York (state)
Year of birth missing (living people)